The Yuneec Power Drive 60 is a Chinese electric motor for powering electric aircraft, designed and produced by Yuneec International of Kunshan, Jiangsu.

Design and development
The Power Drive 60 is part of a family of scalable electric motor designs produced by Yuneec. The family of engines is designed to use the company's own power controller, Lithium polymer battery pack and charger, as an integrated package of components. This ensures that all components are compatible and also removes the need for aircraft builders to separately source components.

The Power Drive 60 is a brushless 133 volt design producing , with an outrunner. The low working rpm of the engine means that it can turn a propeller at efficient speeds without the need for a reduction drive.

Specifications (Power Drive 60)

See also

References

External links

Aircraft electric engines